The FIFA World Cup qualification is a set of competitive matches that a national association football team takes in order to qualify for one of the available berths at the final tournament of the men's FIFA World Cup.

Qualifying tournaments are held within the six FIFA continental zones, each organized by their respective confederations: AFC (Asia), CAF (Africa), CONCACAF (North and Central America and the Caribbean), CONMEBOL (South America), OFC (Oceania), and UEFA (Europe). For each World Cup, FIFA decides the number of places in the finals allocated to each of the zones, based on the numbers and relative strengths of the confederations' teams.

As a courtesy, the host receives an automatic berth selection, as has happened with the immediate past tournament winner during much of the competition's history. All other finalists are determined on a standalone qualifying round achievement without regard to previous achievements.

History 
The berths for the inaugural 1930 tournament were filled by invitation only. The 1934 one was the first one to have an actual qualifying phase. The first ever World Cup qualifying match was played on 11 June 1933, when Sweden defeated Estonia 6–2 in Stockholm, and the first goal was scored 7 minutes into the game, with some sources attributing it to Swedish captain Knut Kroon while others credit it as an own goal by the Estonian goalkeeper Evald Tipner.

While the number of teams which qualified for the finals has increased steadily (16 between 1934 and 1978, then 24 between 1982 and 1994, then 32 from 1998 to 2022, and finally 48 starting from 2026), the qualification format has remained relatively unchanged. The teams are grouped by continent and compete for a fixed number of berths, with one or two places awarded to the winners of intercontinental play-offs.

Qualification berths by continent 

The table below lists the numbers of berths allocated by FIFA for each continent in each tournament. It also shows the total number of teams that entered and played in every qualification cycle.

In the table, "H" denotes an automatic spot for the host, "C" denotes an automatic spot for the defending champion, and "inv" indicates the number of teams that were invited in 1930. Places in intercontinental play-offs are represented as fractions, as follows:
 0.5 – a place in a direct play-off
 0.25 – a place in a semi-final play-off (where the winner would then face yet another team for a spot in the finals)
  – a place in a play-off tournament where two out of six teams would qualify

 Notes

First appearance in qualification by team 

Only teams that played at least one match are considered for the purposes of first appearance. Teams that withdrew prior to the qualification, or that qualified to the World Cup by walkover due to other teams' withdrawals, are not considered.

Teams' entries prior to their actual debuts in qualification

Successor and renamed teams

Other notes

Overview of teams' participations

The below table shows how every team has participated in each World Cup qualification.

Key
 = successful qualifying campaign
 = did not take part in qualifying
 = participated in the final tournament

Non-participating incarnations

Continental allocations

Overall team records
The below table compares the overall records of all teams that have participated in qualification. Teams are ordered by points using the three points for a win system, then by goal difference, and then by goals scored. Note that this order does not represent any official rankings, and qualification tournaments are not direct competitions among all teams.

The "Qualifying attempts" column counts qualifying campaigns where the team played at least one match that was not annulled. An attempt is treated as "successful" if the team gained the right to participate in the finals, even if it did not appear there eventually.

As per statistical convention in football, goals scored during extra time are counted towards matches' scorelines and outcomes, while goals scored during penalty shoot-outs are not. Annulled matches are not counted; for matches that were annulled and then replayed, only the replays are counted. For matches where the scorelines were awarded, the awarded scorelines, and not the original ones (if any), are counted.

The table is updated to the 2022 qualification.

Top scorers
List update 2022 qualification

Other
List update 2022 qualification

Qualification tournament rules

Qualification tournaments generally consist of a number of stages, made up of groups or knock-out ties.

Groups
In all group tournaments, three points are awarded for a win, one for a draw, and none for a loss. FIFA has set the order of the tie-breakers for teams that finish level on points:
goal difference in all group matches
greater number of goals scored in all group matches
Where teams are still not able to be separated, the following tie-breakers are used:
greater number of points obtained in matches between the tied teams
goal difference in matches between the tied teams
greater number of goals scored in matches between the tied teams
goals scored away from home in matches between the tied teams, if the tie is only between two teams
Where teams are still equal, then a play-off on neutral ground, with extra time and penalties if necessary will be played if FIFA deems such a play-off able to be fitted within the coordinated international match calendar. If this is not deemed feasible, then the result will be determined by fair play points and then the drawing of lots.

Note that this order of tie-breaker application has not always been applied. While it was used in the 2010 qualifiers, the qualification for the 2006 World Cup used the head-to-head comparison prior to goal difference (although this system was – where applicable – used in the 2006 finals themselves). If these rules had applied in 2006, then Nigeria would have qualified rather than Angola.

Home-and-away ties
Most knock-out qualifiers (such as the inter-confederation play-offs and many preliminary ties) are played over two legs. The team that scores a greater aggregate number of goals qualifies. Away goals rule applies. If these rules fail to determine the winner, extra time and penalty shootouts are used.

Occasionally – usually when one entrant lacks adequate facilities to host international matches – ties are played over a single leg, in which case matches level after 90 minutes will go to extra time and then to a penalty shootout if required.

Alternatively, "home" matches can be played in neutral countries, or occasionally one team will host both matches. In the latter case the visiting team will still be considered as the "home" team for one of the legs – which may determine which side advances under the away goals rule, as occurred in CONCACAF qualification in 2010.

See also
 FIFA World Cup records and statistics
 FIFA Women's World Cup qualification
 UEFA European Championship qualifying
 AFC Asian Cup qualifiers
 CONCACAF Gold Cup qualification
 Asian nations at the FIFA World Cup
 African nations at the FIFA World Cup
 North, Central American and Caribbean nations at the FIFA World Cup
 South American nations at the FIFA World Cup
 Oceanian nations at the FIFA World Cup
 European nations at the FIFA World Cup

References

External links
 History of the FIFA World Cup preliminary competition (by year). Published by FIFA in November 2009; archived from the original by Wayback Machine on 23 October 2013.
 FIFA World Cup Preliminary Competition Statistics (from FIFA.com)
 FIFA World Cup Preliminary History (from FIFA.com)
 FIFA World Cup 2022 Regulations
 https://www.fifa.com/about-fifa/official-documents